Mura is a genus of cicadas in the family Cicadidae. There is at least one described species in Mura, M. elegantula.

References

Further reading

 
 
 
 
 
 

Fidicinini
Cicadidae genera